Fahita may refer to:
 Fahita (East Timor)
 Abla Fahita, an Egyptian puppet character

See also
 Fajita, in Tex-Mex cuisine, grilled meat usually served as a taco on a flour or corn tortilla